Jaume Traserra i Cunillera (11 July 1934 – 25 January 2019) was a Spanish Roman Catholic bishop.

Traserra Cunillera was born in Spain and was ordained to the priesthood in 1959. He served as titular bishop of Selemselæ and auxiliary bishop of the Roman Catholic Archdiocese of Barcelona, Spain, from 1993 to 2001. He then served as bishop of the Roman Catholic Diocese of Solsona from 2001 to 2010.

Notes

1934 births
2019 deaths
21st-century Roman Catholic bishops in Spain
20th-century Roman Catholic bishops in Spain